"Antecedentes de culpa" ("History of guilt") is a song written and recorded by Mexican singer-songwriter Alfredo Olivas. It was released on 17 November 2017 as the third single of his album "La Rueda de la Fortuna".

Composition
"Antecedentes de culpa" is a norteño song written by Olivas; the song describes a man feeling guilty after a heated argument with his girlfriend while he was drunk.

Music video
The music video for the song was produced by Manuel Gayosso Films and was released on February 13, 2018, three months after the single was released on Digital download and Radio. The video contains footage of Olivas' performance at the Feria de Querétaro on December 8, 2017. Upon its release, the video reached #6 on the Mexico YouTube Trends (Tendencias) list. The video has gained more than 90 million of views on YouTube.

Charts

See also
List of number-one songs of 2018 (Guatemala)
List of number-one songs of 2018 (Mexico)

References

2017 singles
2017 songs
Alfredo Olivas songs
Sony Music Latin singles